Denmoza dulcis-pauli is a species of cactus in the genus Denmoza.

References 
 

Trichocereeae